Hyphessobrycon condotensis is a species of South American tetra, belonging to the family Characidae. They are beige in coloration, with a slightly greenish hue. Just behind the gill, they exhibit a faint darker patch, similar in shape to that of the black phantom tetra. They are known to grow up to around 4 centimeters (1.6 inches) in length. Their species name, condotensis, is derived from one of the waterways in which they are found, known as the Río Condoto. Hyphessobrycon condotensis is known to live in the San Juan River Basin in Colombia. As a benthopelagic fish, they reside away from the surface of the water.

References 

Characidae